Rumen Nikolov (born 5 February 1990) is a Bulgarian footballer who plays as a forward for Sportist General Toshevo.

Career
In November 2009 Cherno More's manager Velizar Popov selected Nikolov for the main squad, and on 28 March 2010 he made his debut in the A PFG at the age of 20 against Minyor Pernik. He decided to wear number 90.

In August 2017 Nikolov joined Dobrudzha Dobrich.

Career statistics
As of 1 June 2013

References

External links

Statistics in Germany at fupa.net

1990 births
Living people
Bulgarian footballers
Bulgaria under-21 international footballers
Association football forwards
PFC Cherno More Varna players
Neftochimic Burgas players
Berliner AK 07 players
Académica Petróleos do Lobito players
Girabola players
FC Chernomorets Balchik players
PFC Dobrudzha Dobrich players
PFC Spartak Varna players
First Professional Football League (Bulgaria) players
Second Professional Football League (Bulgaria) players
Bulgarian expatriate footballers
Bulgarian expatriate sportspeople in Spain
Bulgarian expatriate sportspeople in Germany
Expatriate footballers in Spain
Expatriate footballers in Germany
Expatriate footballers in Angola
Sportspeople from Varna, Bulgaria